The Apocalypse of Zephaniah (or Apocalypse of Sophonias) is a 1st-century pseudepigraphic Jewish text attributed to the Biblical Zephaniah and so associated with the Old Testament, but not regarded as scripture by Jews or any Christian group. It was rediscovered and published at the end of the 19th century.  The canonical Book of Zephaniah has much mystical and apocalyptic imagery, and this apocalyptic-style text deals with a similar subject.

Manuscript Tradition
The existence of the Apocalypse of Zephaniah was known from ancient texts (for example the Stichometry of Nicephorus) but it was considered lost. In 1881 two fragmentary manuscripts, respectively written in Akhmimic and Sahidic Coptic dialects, and probably coming from the White Monastery in Egypt, were bought by the Bibliothèque Nationale of Paris (inventory number Copte 135) and first published by U. Bouriant in 1885. These fragments, together with others later bought by the Staatliche Museum of Berlin (inventory number P 1862), were published in 1899 by Steindorff who recognized in them fragments of the Apocalypse of Zephaniah, of the Apocalypse of Elijah and of another text he called The Anonymous Apocalypse. Schürer in 1899 showed that the Anonymous Apocalypse is most probably part of the Apocalypse of Zephaniah, but there is not unanimous consensus among scholars. The two manuscripts are written in Coptic dialects: the older (early fourth century CE) in Akhmimic, the other (early fifth century CE) in Sahidic and very limited in extension. The original text was probably written in Greek.

To these fragments we could perhaps add a short quotation in a work of Clement of Alexandria (Stromata V, 11:77) of a passage ascribed to Zephaniah that is not in the canonical Book of Zephaniah.

Date and origin
Because the Apocalypse of Zephaniah refers to the story of Susanna, it must be later than 100 BCE. It was also probably known to Clement of Alexandria, and so was written before the last quarter of second century CE. Within this range Wintermute suggests a date before 70 CE, because of a reference to a pro-Edomite tradition.

The text contains no unequivocally Christian passages, and the few that recall the New Testament can be explained as arising also in a Jewish context. It may therefore be Jewish in origin, but may perhaps have been reworked by a Christian. Egypt is the probable place of origin.

Content
The narrative tells of Zephaniah being taken to see the destiny of souls after death.
In the short Sahidic fragment, a soul taken out of its body before repentance for its lawlessness is lashed by five thousand angels. Later Zephaniah sees thousands of thousands of beings with human features (with hair and teeth), but the text is interrupted.
The Akhmimic text includes some fragmentary scenes:
It starts with a short fragmentary scene of a burial and with a vision of inhabitants of a town where there is no darkness, because it is the place for the righteous and the saints. Zephaniah then sees all the souls of those being punished and asks the Lord to have compassion.
The main vision is placed upon Mount Seir: in front of bronze gates, the angels of the Lord write down all the good deeds of the righteous, and the angels of the Accuser (the Greek word διάβολος literally meant slanderer or accuser) write down all the sins of men, in order to accuse them when their souls leave the world. Zephaniah sees myriads of terrible angels with leopard-like faces, tusks and fiery scourges, who cast the souls of ungodly men into their eternal punishment. The seer looks back and sees a sea of flame and the Accuser, with unkempt lioness's hair, bear's teeth, and serpent body, wishing to swallow him. Zephaniah prays the Lord and the great angel Eremiel, "who is over the abyss", appears and saves him. Two scrolls are read to Zephaniah, one with all his sins and one with his good deeds on earth. The good deeds prevail over the sins and the seer is allowed to cross the river and leave Hades. On the boat he puts on an angelic garment.
The Akhmimic fragments ends with some scenes introduced by trumpets sounded by angels. Only three of these scenes have survived. At the first trumpet, victory over the Accuser is proclaimed, and Abraham, Isaac, Jacob, Enoch, Elijah and David are introduced. At the second trumpet, the heavens are opened and Zephaniah sees the sinful souls (which are given body and hair) tormented in a sea of flame until the day when the Lord will judge. He sees also a multitude of saints praying in intercession for those in these torments. The last trumpet mentioned in the fragments prepares for the announcement that the Lord will rise up in his wrath to destroy the earth and the heavens.

Theology
The Apocalypse of Zephaniah, in accordance with the Book of Enoch, presents souls as surviving beyond death. It clearly distinguishes between the personal judgment occurring immediately after death and the final judgment by the Lord. After death the soul is sought by the fallen angels of Satan and by the angels of the Lord. Judgment is based only on the balance between good deeds and sins during the whole of life, indicating that the book was influenced by Pharisaism. Souls enter bliss or punishment immediately after the first judgment, while waiting for the Lord's coming, but the intercession of the saints makes it possible that, for some, punishment may not be definitive. This view differs from that of other contemporary texts such as 2 Enoch.

Notes

External links
online text

1st-century works
Old Testament pseudepigrapha
Apocalyptic literature
Book of Zephaniah
Jewish texts